Karen C. Page (later Tapper) is a former pentathlete from New Zealand.

In 1978, Page travelled to Albuquerque, New Mexico, to compete in the United States indoor pentathlon event, finishing second. Also in 1978, Page represented New Zealand at the Commonwealth Games in Edmonton, Canada, placing fifth. She was selected for the New Zealand Olympic team to compete at the 1980 Summer Olympics in Moscow, however the New Zealand boycott of the Games meant she did not attend.

In 1981 Page won the gold medal, and set a new national women's record for the pentathlon, at the Fourth Pacific Conference Games in Christchurch.

References

Living people
New Zealand pentathletes
Commonwealth Games competitors for New Zealand
Athletes (track and field) at the 1978 Commonwealth Games
Year of birth missing (living people)
20th-century New Zealand women